Boakye-Yiadom is a Ghanaian surname. Notable people with this name include:

Anthony Boakye-Yiadom, Ghanaian politician
Henry Yiadom Boakye (born 1969), Ghanaian politician
Henry Yeboah Yiadom-Boachie (born 1972), Ghanaian politician
Kelvin Boakye Yiadom (born 2000), Ghanaian footballer
Kofi Boakye Yiadom (died 2020), Ghanaian singer and songwriter
Lynette Yiadom-Boakye (born 1977), British painter and writer
Nana Boakye-Yiadom (disambiguation)
Nana Boakye-Yiadom (footballer) (born 1996), English footballer
Nana Boakye-Yiadom (journalist) (born 1983), Ghanaian journalist
Richmond Yiadom Boakye (born 1993), Ghanaian footballer
Patrick Boakye-Yiadom (born 1976), Ghanaian politician

See also 
 Boakye
 Yiadom

English-language surnames
Ghanaian surnames